This list is of the Historic Sites of Japan located within the Prefecture of Mie.

National Historic Sites
As of 1 January 2021, thirty-nine Sites have been designated as being of national significance (including one *Special Historic Site); Kumano Sanzan spans the prefectural borders with Wakayama and Kumano Sankeimichi spans the prefectural borders with both Wakayama and Nara.

|-
|}

Prefectural Historic Sites
As of 1 May 2020, seventy-four Sites have been designated as being of prefectural importance.

Municipal Historic Sites
As of 1 May 2020, a further two hundred and twenty Sites have been designated as being of municipal importance.

Registered Historic Sites
As of 1 January 2021, one Monument has been registered (as opposed to designated) as an Historic Site at a national level.

See also

 Cultural Properties of Japan
 Ise, Shima, Iga, Kii Provinces
 List of Places of Scenic Beauty of Japan (Mie)
 List of Cultural Properties of Japan - paintings (Mie)
 List of Cultural Properties of Japan - historical materials (Mie)
 Mie Prefectural Museum

References

External links
  Cultural Properties in Mie Prefecture

Mie Prefecture
 Mie